Elbert Nostrand "Bert" Carvel (February 9, 1910 – February 6, 2005) was an American businessman and politician from Laurel, in Sussex County, Delaware. He was a member of the Democratic Party, who served as the 12th Lieutenant Governor of Delaware and two non-consecutive terms as the Governor of Delaware.

Early life and family
Carvel was born at Shelter Island, Long Island, New York, son of Arnold W. and Elizabeth Nostrand Carvel. Kent Island, Maryland was his childhood home. He married Ann Hall Valliant in 1932 and they had four children, Edwin, Elizabeth, Ann Hall and Barbara. They were members of St. Philip's Episcopal Church in Laurel, Delaware.

Professional and political career
After moving to Laurel in 1936, he began his management of the Valliant Fertilizer Company, that would continue throughout his political career. In his first attempt at public office, Carvel was elected lieutenant governor in 1944, defeating Republican Clayton Bunting, Sr. He served one term from January 16, 1945, to January 18, 1949.

He appeared on the television show What's My Line? on November 13, 1960, as the nascent Governor-elect (second term) of Delaware  where his "line" was "manufactures fertilizers."

Governor of Delaware

Carvel was first elected Governor of Delaware in 1948, defeating Republican Hyland F. George and served one term from January 18, 1949, to January 20, 1953. He lost a bid for a second term in 1952 to U.S. Representative J. Caleb Boggs. Subsequently, he lost an election for U.S. Senate in 1958 to incumbent Republican U.S. Senator John J. Williams. However, he was elected to a second term as Governor of Delaware in 1960, defeating Republican John W. Rollins, a former lieutenant governor. Soon after this, on November 13, 1960, he appeared as a contestant on the TV game show What's My Line?. His line was that he manufactured fertilizer. This time he served from January 17, 1961, until January 19, 1965. Carvel lost a final bid for a U.S. Senate seat in 1964, again to incumbent Republican U.S. Senator John J. Williams.

As only the second Democrat elected governor in 48 years, he was also the first Democrat ever to win two terms. He was opposed to capital punishment and was an early and persistent leader for civil rights legislation in a still politically conservative Delaware. As Governor he led the successful effort to create a Delaware Supreme Court, the lack of which threatened Delaware's ability to handle corporate litigation, and thereby ended Delaware's status as the only state without such a court.

Among his other accomplishments during his tenures in office were the building of the first span of the Delaware Memorial Bridge, developing numerous other roads and highways, establishing the Delaware Public Service Commission and initiating the Delaware State Development Department.

Death and legacy
Carvel died in Laurel, Delaware, three days before what would have been his 95th birthday and is buried at the Carvel Family Cemetery, Kent Island, Maryland.

Known as "Big Bert," Carvel stood 6' 6". He was known as a liberal Democrat from conservative "lower Delaware," and never hesitated to promote causes of importance to him regardless of their impact on his political career or his fertilizer business. The state office building at 820 North French Street, Wilmington is named for him, as is the University of Delaware Research and Education Center in Georgetown. The cafeteria in North Laurel Elementary School is named the "Carvel Room", after him.

Almanac
Elections are held the first Tuesday after November 1. The Governor and Lieutenant Governor take office the third Tuesday of January and have four-year terms.

References

Images
Hall of Governors Portrait Gallery; Portrait courtesy of Historical and Cultural Affairs, Dover.

External links
Biographical Directory of the Governors of the United States 
 
Delaware's Governors 
University of Delaware Obituary 

 

 

 

1910 births
2005 deaths
People from Laurel, Delaware
Businesspeople from Delaware
Lieutenant Governors of Delaware
Democratic Party governors of Delaware
Burials in Maryland
20th-century American politicians
People from Shelter Island, New York
20th-century American businesspeople
20th-century American Episcopalians